Col de la Croix (or Bocca a Croce) is a mountain pass in the department of Corse-du-Sud in France.

It is in the commune of Osani, and connects Porto and Galéria.

References

Mountain passes of Corse-du-Sud